Patrick Reimer (born 10 December 1982) is a German former professional ice hockey forward who played for the DEG Metro Stars and Nürnberg Ice Tigers of the Deutsche Eishockey Liga (DEL).

Playing career
Born in Mindelheim, Reimer and his younger brother Jochen started playing ice hockey at EV Bad Wörishofen, before joining the youth setup of ESV Kaufbeuren. He made his debut on Kaufbeuren's men's team in Germany's third division during the 2001-02 season and played his first game in Germany's top-flight Deutsche Eishockey Liga (DEL) for Düsseldorfer EG during the 2003-04 season. In his first full season with DEG in 2004–05, Reimer was selected as the DEL's Rookie of the Year. During his nine-year tenure at the club, he established himself as one of the best domestic players of the German league.

On 26 January 2012, Reimer agreed to leave Düsseldorfer EG at the season's end to join fellow DEL team Nürnberg Ice Tigers on a three-year contract. In January 2014, he penned a contract extension until 2017. He received DEL Player of the Year honors in 2014, 2016 and 2017.

On 15 January 2016, he scored his 263rd DEL goal, making him the all-time career goal-scoring leader in DEL. On 24 February 2017, he scored his 300th DEL goal. He is the first player to reach this historic mark.

During the 2022–23 season, Reimer announced his retirement at the conclusion of his 20th DEL year. He posted 42 points in 47 regular season games before ending his career in the pre-playoff round against the Fischtown Pinguins. He completed his career finishing as the DEL's all-time leading goal and points scorer with 349 goals, 419 assists for 768 points in 932 regular season games and adding 90 points in 135 playoff games. It was announced his jersey would be retired by the Ice Tigers in the following season.

International play

Reimer made his debut on the German national team in 2005. On 21 February 2018, Reimer scored the overtime game-winning goal to defeat Sweden in the quarter finals of the 2018 Winter Olympics in Pyeongchang, before capturing silver with Germany. After 105 caps for Germany (29 goals, 27 assists) and participating in five World Championships and the 2018 Winter Olympics, Reimer announced the end of his internationals career in April 2018.

Career statistics

Regular season and playoffs

International

References

External links

 

1982 births
Living people
DEG Metro Stars players
German ice hockey right wingers
People from Mindelheim
Sportspeople from Swabia (Bavaria)
Ice hockey players at the 2018 Winter Olympics
ESV Kaufbeuren players
Medalists at the 2018 Winter Olympics
Nürnberg Ice Tigers players
Olympic ice hockey players of Germany
Olympic medalists in ice hockey
Olympic silver medalists for Germany
Thomas Sabo Ice Tigers players